Nguri (lit. "bovine milk") is a buffalo's milk cheese of Fujian province, China.  It is in a ball-shape approximately the size of a table tennis ball and has a soft, leathery texture.  It is made by shaping with a cheese cloth the mixture of milk and vinegar that has been marinated in a salty brine. It is served as a condiment to plain rice congee.  A small bite of this condiment could complement a large mouthful of plain congee, as it is very salty.

It is also sometimes referred to as Giam-ngu-ring (lit. "salty milk"), and is said to originate from Jiaomei in Zhangzhou, Fujian.

See also
 Fujian cuisine
 List of cheeses
 List of water buffalo cheeses

References

Chinese cheeses
Water buffalo's-milk cheeses
Brined cheeses